The Sebeș is a left tributary of the river Mureș in Transylvania, Romania. The upper reach of the river (upstream of Lake Oașa) is also known as Frumoasa. The Romanian and Hungarian name Sebeș and Sebes originate from the Hungarian adjective sebes meaning "speedy", while the German name means Mill Creek. The source of the river is on the south slope of the Cindrel Mountains, in the southwestern part of Sibiu County. It flows through the reservoirs Oașa and Tău. It discharges into the Mureș in Oarda, near Alba Iulia.

Towns and villages
The following towns and villages are situated along the river Sebeș, from source to mouth: Dobra, Șugag, Căpâlna, Laz, Săsciori, Sebeșel, Petrești, Sebeș, Lancrăm, Oarda.

Tributaries
The following rivers are tributaries to the river Sebeș (from source to mouth):

Left: Tărtărău, Sălanele, Valea Mare, Prigoana, Gâlceag, Miraș, Neagu, Groșești, Mărtinia
Right: Curpăt, Ciban, Bistra, Dobra, Nedeiu, Secaș

References

Rivers of Romania
 
Rivers of Alba County
Rivers of Sibiu County
Sebeș